Nils Ramiro Reichmuth (born 22 February 2002) is a Swiss professional footballer who plays as a midfielder for Swiss club Wil on loan from Zürich.

Personal life
Reichmuth was born in Switzerland to a Swiss father and Chilean mother. His younger brother, Miguel Raffael, is also a footballer who plays for Zürich U21.

Career statistics

Club

Notes

References

2002 births
Living people
Swiss men's footballers
Swiss people of Chilean descent
Sportspeople of Chilean descent
Switzerland youth international footballers
Association football midfielders
Swiss Super League players
Swiss Challenge League players
FC Zürich players
FC Wil players
People from Zug
Sportspeople from the canton of Zug